Kolab is a free and open source groupware suite.

It may also refer to:

Places
Kolab Dam, a gravity dam situated near Jeypore town in Koraput district of Odisha, India
Kolab Jial, a town and Union council of Kingri Taluka, Sindh, Pakistan
Kolab River, one of the major rivers of Odisha, India

Others
Kolab Now, a web-based email and groupware service, based completely on free and open-source software
Kolab Pailin, a Khmer novel that was written by Nhok Them in B.E 2504